In telecommunication, a combat-net radio (CNR) is a radio operating in a network that (a) provides a half-duplex circuit and (b) uses either a single radio frequency or a discrete set of radio frequencies when in a frequency hopping mode.

CNRs are primarily used for push-to-talk-operated radio nets for command and control of combat, combat support, and combat service support operations among military ground, sea, and air forces.

In the United States, two military standards govern the use of combat net radios and the host applications that communicate over the network: MIL-STD-188-220 and MIL-STD-2045-47001. In addition to IETF RFCs governing UDP, TCP, and IPv4/IPv6, all seven layers of the OSI communications architecture are addressed. MIL-STD-2045-47001 covers layer 7 (application), while MIL-STD-188-220 covers layers 1 through 3 (physical, data link, and network).

Examples
AN/PRC-152 by Harris Corporation
AN/PRC-117
AN/PRC-77
SINCGARS
AN/PRC-148 MBITR
PR4G by Thales Communications
PRC-525 by EID
Clansman
Leopard1 by Sat-Com Pty Ltd

See also
JTRS
Joint Electronics Type Designation System
Software-defined radio

References

Military radio systems